Rodrigo Reyes Orozco (born 1 February 2001) is a Mexican professional footballer who plays as a defender for Liga de Expansión MX club Tapatío, on loan from Liga MX club Guadalajara.

Club career

Guadalajara 
Reyes began his career with Guadalajara, his hometown club. He played for and captained the club's U-20 side in 2021, and scored 2 goals in 10 appearances.

Loan to Valour FC 
In June 2021, he was loaned to Valour FC ahead of the 2021 Canadian Premier League season.

Career statistics

References

External links
 

2001 births
Living people
Mexican footballers
Association football defenders
C.D. Guadalajara footballers
Valour FC players
Canadian Premier League players
Mexican expatriate footballers
Mexican expatriate sportspeople in Canada
Expatriate soccer players in Canada
Footballers from Jalisco
Sportspeople from Guadalajara, Jalisco